The Ariel Award is an award that recognizes the best of Mexican cinema. Given annually, since 1946, by the Mexican Academy of Cinematographic Arts and Sciences (AMACC), the award recognizes artistical and technical excellence in the Mexican film industry. The purpose of the Ariel recognition is to stimulate and increase the excellence of Mexican cinema, favor the growth of the industry, and promote the meeting and strengthening of the national film community. It is regarded as the most prestigious award in the Mexican film industry and considered Mexico's equivalent to the Oscars of the United States.

History 
The statuette is in the image of a man and it was designed by the sculptor Ignacio Asúnsolo. The original statuette is currently found inside Churubusco Studios in Mexico City. The name "Ariel" was inspired by a series of short writings called El Ariel by Uruguayan writer José Enrique Rodó that inspired generations of young Latin Americans in the first decades of the 20th century.

Awards 

Ariel de Oro (Golden Ariel)
Ariel Award for Best Picture
Ariel Award for Best Director
Ariel Award for Best Actress
Ariel Award for Best Actor
Ariel Award for Best Supporting Actor
Ariel Award for Best Supporting Actress
Ariel Award for Best Breakthrough Performance

Ariel Award for Best Original Screenplay
Ariel Award for Best Cinematography
Ariel Award for Best Editing
Ariel Award for Best Original Score
Ariel Award for Best Sound
Ariel Award for Best Art Design
Ariel Award for Best Costume Design
Ariel Award for Best Makeup

Ariel Award for Best Special Effects
Ariel Award for Best First Work
Ariel Award for Best Short Documentary
Ariel Award for Best Feature Documentary
Ariel Award for Best Feature Animation
Ariel Award for Best Fiction Short
Ariel Award for Best Animated Short
Ariel Award for Best Ibero-American Film
Ariel Award for Best Actor in a Minor Role
Ariel Award for Best Actress in a Minor Role
Ariel Award for Best Child Performance
Ariel Award for Best Youth Performance

Ariel a Mejor Ambientación
Ariel a Mejor Argumento Original (Best Original Story)
Ariel a Mejor Cortometraje Educativo, Científico o de Divulgación Artística (Best Educational, Scientific, or Artistic Short Film)
Ariel a Mejor Escenografía (Best Production Design)
Ariel a Mejor Guión Adaptado (Best Adapted Screenplay)
Ariel a Mejor Guión Cinematográfico (Best Screenplay for Cinema)
Ariel a Mejor Música de Fondo (Best Score)
Ariel a Mejor Mediometraje Ficción (Best Medium-Length Fiction)
Ariel a Mejor Mediometraje Documental (Best Medium-Length Documentary)
Ariel a Mejor Tema Musical (Best Song)

Additional awards 

 Ariel Especial de Plata (Special Silver Ariel)
 Premio Especial (Special Ariel)
 Premio de Honor (Honorary Award)†
 Premio Medalla Salvador Toscano (Salvador Toscano Medal)
 Reconocimiento del Instituto Mexicano de Cinematografía (Special Recognition)
 Diploma de Honor (Honorary Diploma)

References

External links 
Academia Mexicana de Artes y Ciencias Cinematograficas Official Website (In Spanish)
Ariel Awards, Mexico at Internet Movie Database
History of the Ariel  at the Mexican Academy of Film.
El Ariel  at wikisource
Premio Ariel - Historia

 
Mexican film awards
1947 establishments in Mexico
Film editing awards